This list of the Cenozoic life of Georgia contains the various prehistoric life-forms whose fossilized remains have been reported from within the US state of Georgia and are between 66 million and 10,000 years of age.

A

 †Abdounia
 †Abdounia enniskilleni
 Abra
 †Abra aequalis
  Acanthocardia
 †Acanthocardia glebosum
 †Acanthocardia tuomeyi
 Acar
 †Acar domingensis – tentative report
 Acteocina
 †Acteocina canaliculata
 †Actinacis
 †Actinacis alabamensis
 Aequipecten
 †Aequipecten clinchfieldensis
 †Aequipecten spillmani
 †Aequipecten suwaneensis
 Aetobatus
  †Aetobatus narinari
 Agassizia
 †Agassizia conradi
 Agkistrodon
  †Agkistrodon piscivorus
 †Agomphus
 †Agomphus oxysternum – type locality for species
 Aix
 †Aix sponsa
 Alligator
  †Alligator mississippiensis
 Alosa – or unidentified comparable form
 Alveopora
 Amauropsis
 †Amauropsis ocalana
 †Ambystoma
 †Ambystoma maculatum – or unidentified comparable form
 †Ambystoma tigrinum
 Amnicola
 †Amnicola expansilabris
 †Amnicola georgiensis
 †Amnicola saltillensis
  Amphiuma
 †Ampullina
 †Ampullina flintensis – or unidentified comparable form
 †Ampullina solida
 †Ampullina streptostoma
 †Ampullinopsis
 †Ampullinopsis amphora
 Amusium
 †Amusium ocalanum
 Anadara
  †Anadara brasiliana
 †Anadara ovalis
 †Anadara santarosana
 †Anadara transversa
 Anas
 †Anas acuta
 †Anas americana
 †Anas crecca
 †Anas discors
 †Anas platyrhynchos – or unidentified comparable form
 †Anas rubripes
 †Anas strepera
 Anolis
  †Anolis carolinensis
 Anomia
 †Anomia lisbonensis
 †Anomia simplex
 †Anomia suwaneensis
 †Anoplonassa – type locality for genus
 †Anoplonassa forcipata – type locality for species
 †Antiguastrea
 †Antiguastrea cellulosa
 Apalone
  †Apalone ferox
 †Aporolepas
 †Aporolepas howei
 †Araloselachus
 †Araloselachus cuspidata
 Arca
 †Arca subrotracta
 Archaeolithothamnium
 Architectonica
 †Architectonica nobilis
 †Archosargus
  †Archosargus probatocephalus
 Arcoperna
 †Arcoperna inflata
 Arius
 †Arius felis
 Asio
 Astarte – report made of unidentified related form or using admittedly obsolete nomenclature
 †Astarte subpontis
  Astrangia
 †Astrangia danae
 Astreopora
 †Astreopora antiguensis
 †Astrocoenia
 †Astrocoenia decaturensis – type locality for species
 Athleta – or unidentified comparable form
 Atrina
 †Atrina jacksoniana
 Aythya
 †Aythya collaris

B

 Bairdiella
 †Bairdiella chrysoura – or unidentified comparable form
 Balistes
 Barbatia
 †Barbatia cuculloides
 Bartramia
 †Bartramia longicauda
   †Basilosaurus
 †Basilosaurus cetoides
 Bathytormus
 †Bathytormus protextus
 Bison
  †Bison bison – tentative report
 Bittium
 †Bittium silicium
 Blarina
 †Blarina brevicauda
 †Blarina carolinensis
 Bonasa
  †Bonasa umbellus
 Bornia
 †Bornia isosceles
 †Braarudosphaera
 †Braarudosphaera bigelowii
 Brissus
 Bucephala
 †Bucephala albeola
 Bufo
  †Bufo americanus
 †Burnhamia
 †Burnhamia daviesi
 Bursa
 †Bursa vitrix
 Busycon
 †Busycon carica
 †Busycon foerstei – type locality for species
 †Busycon proterum – type locality for species

C

 †Calippus
 Callista
 †Callista perovata
 †Calorhadia
 †Calorhadia pharcida
 Calyptraea
 †Calyptraea centralis
 Campanile
 †Campanile claytonense
 Canachites
 †Canachites canadensis
 Canis
  †Canis lupus – or unidentified comparable form
 Carcharhinus
 †Carcharhinus gibbesi
 †Carcharhinus leucas
 †Carcharhinus macloti – or unidentified comparable form
  †Carcharhinus obscurus
 Carcharias
 †Carcharias accutissima
 †Carcharias hopei
  †Carcharias taurus
 †Carcharis
 †Carcharis koerti
  Carcharodon
 †Carcharodon auriculatus
 Cardita
 †Cardita shepardi
 Carditamera
 †Carditamera apotegea
 Carphophis
 †Carphophis amoenus
 Carya
 Cassis
 †Cassis globosa
 †Cassis inornatus
 †Cassis sulcifera
 Castor
 †Castor canadensis
  †Castoroides
 †Castoroides ohioensis
 Catoptrophorus – or unidentified comparable form
 †Catoptrophorus semipalmatus
 Cerithiopsis
 †Cerithiopsis diagona
  Cerithium
 †Cerithium cookei
 †Cerithium corallicolum
 †Cerithium eutextile
 †Cerithium gainesense
 †Cerithium georgianum
 †Cerithium halense
 †Cerithium hernandoensis – or unidentified comparable form
 †Cerithium insulatum
 †Cerithium mascotianum
 †Cerithium platynema
 †Cerithium praecursor – tentative report
 †Cerithium silicifluvium
 †Cerithium vaughani
 Cervus
  †Cervus elaphus
 †Cestumcerithium
 †Cestumcerithium vaginatum
 Chama
 †Chama gainesensis
 Cheiloporina
 †Cheiloporina anderseni – type locality for species
 Chelydra
  †Chelydra serpentina
 †Chiasmolithus
 †Chiasmolithus modestus
 †Chiasmolithus solitus
 †Chiasmolithus titus
 Chionopsis
 †Chionopsis bainbridgensis
  Chlamys
 †Chlamys anatipes
 †Chlamys cawcawensis
 †Chlamys choctavensis
 †Chlamys deshayesii
 †Chlamys indecisa
 †Chlamys nupera
 Chlorostoma
 †Chlorostoma exolutum
  Clypeaster
 †Clypeaster cotteaui
  Coccolithus
 †Coccolithus formosus
 †Coccolithus pelagicus
 Colaptes
 †Colaptes auratus
 Colinus
 †Colinus virginianus
 Coluber
 †Coluber constrictor
 Conepatus
 †Conepatus leuconotus
 Conomitra
 †Conomitra subpontis
  Conus
 †Conus cookei
 †Conus demiurgus
 †Conus sauridens
 †Conus vaughani
 †Copemys – or unidentified comparable form
 Coragyps
 †Coragyps atratus
 Corbula
 †Corbula alabamiensis
 †Corbula subcompressa
 Corvus
 †Corvus brachyrhynchos
  †Corvus corax
 Crassatella
 †Crassatella deformis
 †Crassatella gabbi
 †Crassatella ioannes
 †Crassatella ocordia
 Crassatellites
 †Crassatellites paramesus
 Crassostrea
 †Crassostrea virginica
 Crepidula
 †Crepidula fornicata
 †Cribocentrum
 †Cribocentrum reticulatum
  Crocodylus
 Crotalus
  †Crotalus horridus
 Crucibulum
 †Crucibulum multilineatum
 Ctenoides
 †Ctenoides tricinta
 †Cubitostrea
 †Cubitostrea perplicata
 †Cubitostrea sellaeformis
 Cucullaea
 Cyanocitta
 †Cyanocitta cristata
 †Cyclicargolithus
 †Cyclicargolithus pseudogammation
 Cygnus
 †Cygnus columbianus
 †Cylindracanthus
 †Cylindracanthus rectus
 Cymatium
 †Cymatium cecilianum
  †Cynthiacetus
 †Cynthiacetus maxwelli
 Cypraea
 Cyrena
 †Cyrena floridana

D

 Dasyatis
 †Dasyatis borodini – type locality for species
 †Dasyatis charlisae – type locality for species
 Dasypus
  †Dasypus bellus
 Deirochelys
 †Deirochelys reticularia
 Dentalium
 †Dentalium thalloides
 †Dhondtichlamys
 †Dhondtichlamys greggi
 Diadophis
 †Diadophis punctatus
 Diastoma
 †Diastoma georgiana
 Dictyococcites
 †Dictyococcites bisectus
 †Dictyococcites scrippsae
 Didelphis
  †Didelphis marsupialis
 †Didelphis virginiana
 Diodora
 †Diodora pumpellyi – type locality for species
 †Dioplotherium
 †Dioplotherium manigaulti
 Diploastrea
 †Diploastrea crassolamellata
  †Discoaster
 †Discoaster barbadiensis
 Divalinga
 †Divalinga quadrisulcata
 Donax
 †Donax variabilis
  †Dorudon
 †Dorudon serratus
 Dosinia
 †Dosiniopsis
 †Dosiniopsis lenticularis
 Dryocopus
 †Dryocopus pileatus

E

 †Echanthus
 †Echanthus georgiensis – type locality for species
 Echinolampas
 †Ectopistes
  †Ectopistes migratorius
 Edaphodon
 Elops
 †Elops saurus
 Eontia
 †Eontia ponderosa
 Epitonium
 †Epitonium dubiosum
 †Epitonium rupicola
 Eptesicus
 †Eptesicus fuscus – or unidentified comparable form
 Equus
 †Equus complicatus – tentative report
 †Equus leidyi
 †Equus litoralis
  †Equus simplicidens
  †Eremotherium
 †Eremotherium laurillardi
 Eschrichtius
 †Eschrichtius robustus
 †Eucastor
 Eupatagus
 Eupleura
 †Eupleura caudata

F

 Falco
 †Falco sparverius
  Favites
 †Favites polygonalis
 Felis
 Floridina
 †Floridina asymmetrica
 †Fundulus
 Fusinus
 †Fusinus exilis

G

 Galeocerdo
 †Galeocerdo alabamensis
 †Galeocerdo clarkensis
  †Galeocerdo cuvier
 †Galeocerdo latidens
 Galeorhinus
 †Galeorhinus galeus
 †Galeorhinus huberensis – type locality for species
 Gari
 †Gari cerasia
 Gastrochaena
 †Gastrochaena cimitariopsis
 †Gastrochaena dalliana
 †Gastrochaena gainesensis
 Gemma
 †Gemma purpurea
  †Georgiacetus – type locality for genus
 †Georgiacetus vogtlensis – type locality for species
 Ginglymostoma
 †Ginglymostoma cirratum
 †Ginglymostoma obliquum
 †Ginglymostoma serra
 †Gitolampas
 †Gitolampas georgiensis
 Glycymeris
 †Glycymeris cookei
 †Glycymeris mississippiensis
 Glyptemys
 †Glyptemys insculpta
  Goniopora
 †Goniopora decaturensis – type locality for species
 Gopherus
  †Gopherus polyphemus

H

 †Hadralucina – report made of unidentified related form or using admittedly obsolete nomenclature
 †Hadralucina augustana
 Haustator
 †Haustator carinata
 †Helicosphaera
 †Helicosphaera seminulum
 Hemimactra
 †Hemimactra densa
  Hemipristis
 †Hemipristis curvatus
 †Hemipristis wyattdurhami
 †Hercoglossa
 †Hercoglossa ulrichi
 Hesperibalanus
 †Hesperibalanus huddlestuni – type locality for species
 Hesperisternia
 †Hesperisternia bainbridgensis – type locality for species
 †Hesperotestudo
 †Hesperotestudo crassicutata
 †Hesperotestudo incisa
  Heterodon
 †Heterodon platyrhinos
  Heterodontus
 †Heterodontus pinetti – type locality for species
 Hexaplex
 †Hexaplex fulvescens
 Hincksina
 †Hincksina ocalensis
 Hippopleurifera
 †Hippopleurifera incondita
 †Hippopleurifera mcbeanensis – type locality for species
 Hippopodina
 †Hippopodina stephensi – type locality for species
 Hippoporina
 †Hippoporina vespertilio
  †Hippotherium
  †Holmesina
 †Holmesina septentrionalis
 †Huberophis – type locality for genus
 †Huberophis georgiensis – type locality for species
 Hyla
 †Hyla crucifer

I

 Isurus
  †Isurus oxyrinchus
 †Isurus praecursor

K

 †Kapalmerella
 †Kapalmerella mortoni
 †Kathpalmeria
 †Kathpalmeria georgiana
  Kinosternon
 †Kleidionella
 †Kleidionella mcbeanensis – type locality for species

L

  †Lactophrys
 Laevicardium
 †Lagodon
 †Lagodon rhomboides
  Lamna
 †Lamna twiggsensis – type locality for species
 Lampropeltis
 †Lampropeltis getulus
 †Lampropeltis triangulum
  Leopardus
 †Lepidocyclina
  Lepisosteus
 †Leptotragulus
 Lima
 †Lima halensis
 Lindapecten
 †Lindapecten chipolanus
 †Linthia
 †Linthia prima – type locality for species
 Liotia
 †Liotia halensis
 †Liotia persculpturata
 Liquidambar
 †Lirodiscus
 †Lirodiscus tellinoides
 Lithophaga
 †Lithophaga gainesensis
 †Lithophaga nuda
 †Lithoporella
 †Litorhadia
 †Litorhadia bastropensis
 Littoraria
 †Littoraria irrorata
 Lontra
  †Lontra canadensis
 Lopha
 †Lopha vicksburgensis
 Lophelia
 †Lophelia tubaeformis – type locality for species
 Lophodytes
 †Lophodytes cucullatus
 †Lophoranina
 †Lophoranina georgiana
 Lucina
 Lynx
  †Lynx rufus
 Lyria
 †Lyria mansfieldi
 †Lyria silicata – or unidentified related form
 †Lyropecten
 †Lyropecten duncanensis

M

 Macrocallista
 †Macrocallista subimpressa
 Mactra
 †Mactra mississippiensis
 Malaclemys
 †Malaclemys terrapin
 †Mammut
  †Mammut americanum
 †Mammut floridanum
 †Mammuthus
  †Mammuthus columbi
 Margarites
 †Margarites crallicus
 Marginella
 †Marginella halensis
 †Marginella silicifluvia
 Marmota
 †Marmota monax
 †Mazzalina – or unidentified comparable form
 †Mazzalina impressa
  †Megalonyx
  †Megatherium
 †Megatherium americanum
 †Megatherium mirable
 Melanerpes
 Meleagris
 †Meleagris gallopavo
 Melongena
 †Melongena corona
 Membraniporidra
 Mephitis
  †Mephitis mephitis
 Mercenaria
 †Mercenaria langdoni
 †Mercenaria mercenaria
 †Mercenaria prodroma
 Meretrix
 †Meretrix calcanea
 †Meretrix silicifluvia
 Mesalia
 †Mesalia alabamiensis
 †Mesalia georgiana
 †Mesalia pumila
 †Mesalia vetusta
 †Mesomorpha – report made of unidentified related form or using admittedly obsolete nomenclature
 †Metradolium
 †Metradolium areolatum – type locality for species
 Microtus
 †Microtus pennsylvanicus
  †Microtus pinetorum
 Miltha
 †Miltha claibornensis
 †Miltha hillsboroensis
  †Miracinonyx
 †Miracinonyx inexpectatus – or unidentified comparable form
 Mitra
 †Mitra syra
 Modiolaria
 Modiolus
 †Modiolus grammatus
 †Modiolus subpontis
 †Monosaulax – or unidentified comparable form
 Montastraea
 †Montastraea bainbridgensis – type locality for species
  Mugil
 Mulinia
 †Mulinia congesta
 †Mulinia lateralis
 Mustela
 †Mustela frenata – or unidentified comparable form
 †Mustules
 †Mustules vanderhoefti
 Myliobatis
  †Mylohyus
 †Mylohyus fossilis
 Myotis
 †Myotis grisescens – or unidentified comparable form
 †Myotis lucifugus – or unidentified comparable form

N

  Nassarius
 †Nassarius acutus
 †Nassarius rabdota – type locality for species
 Natica
 †Natica mediavia
 †Nebraskophis
 Nebrius
 †Nebrius theilensis
 Negaprion
  †Negaprion brevirostris
 †Negaprion eurybathrodon
 †Negaprior
 †Negaprior eurybathrodon
 Nellia
 †Nellia tenella
 †Neochoerus
 †Neochoerus aesopi
 †Neochoerus pinckneyi – or unidentified comparable form
 Neofiber
 †Neofiber alleni
 Neomonachus
  †Neomonachus tropicalis
 Neotoma
 †Neotoma floridana
 Nerita
 †Nerita tampaensis
 Neritina
 Nerodia
  †Nerodia fasciata
 †Nerodia sipedon
 Neverita
 †Neverita duplicatus
 †Neverita eucallosus
 Notophthalmus
  †Notophthalmus viridescens
 Nucleolites
 †Nucleolites gouldii
 Nucula
 †Nucula ovula
 †Nucula proxima
 Nuculana
 †Nuculana magna
 †Nuculana saffordana
 †Nuculana trumani
  Nummulites
 †Nummulites wilcoxi

O

 †Ochetosella
 †Ochetosella jacksonica
 †Ochetosella parva – type locality for species
 Odocoileus
  †Odocoileus virginianus
  Odontaspis
 †Odontaspis acutissima
 †Odontogryphaea
 †Odontogryphaea thirsae
 †Ogmophis
 †Ogmophis voorhiesi – type locality for species
 †Oligopygus
 †Oligopygus haldermani
 †Oligopygus rotundus
 †Oligotresium
 †Oligotresium howei – type locality for species
 Oliva
 †Oliva sayana
 Ondatra
 †Ondatra zibethicus
 †Ontocetus
 †Ontocetus emmonsi
  †Opsanus
 †Orbitoides
 †Orbitoides papyracea
 †Orthaulax
 †Orthaulax hernandoensis
 †Orthosurcula
 †Orthosurcula indenta
 Oryzomys
 †Oryzomys palustris
 Ostrea
 †Ostrea crenulimarginata
 †Ostrea mauricensis
 †Ostrea podagrina
 †Ostrea sinuosa
  †Otodus
 †Otodus angustidens
 †Otodus aruiculatus
 Otus
 †Otus asio

P

 †Palaeolama
 †Palaeolama mirifica
  †Palaeophis
 †Palaeophis africanus
 †Palaeorhncodon
 Paludestrina
 †Paludestrina plana
 Panopea
 †Panopea alabama
 Panthera
  †Panthera onca
  †Paramylodon
 †Paramylodon harlani
 †Pastinacea
 Pecten
 †Pecten alpha
 †Pecten perplanus
 Pekania
 †Pekania pennanti
 †Periarchus
 †Periarchus floridanus
 †Periarchus lyelli
 Perigastrella
 †Perigastrella elegans
 Periglypta
 †Periglypta caesarina – or unidentified related form
 Peromyscus
  †Peromyscus leucopus – or unidentified comparable form
 †Peromyscus maniculatus – or unidentified comparable form
 †Peromyscus polionotus – or unidentified comparable form
 Persicula
 †Persicula progravida – type locality for species
 Persististrombus
 †Persististrombus chipolanus
 Petricola
 †Petricola pholadiformis
 Phacoides
 †Phacoides perovatus
 †Phacoides wacissanus – or unidentified comparable form
 Phyllodus
  Physeter
 †Physeter vetus – tentative report
 †Physeterula
 †Physeterula neolassicus – tentative report
 †Physogaleus
 †Physogaleus secundus
 Pica
 †Pica pica
 Picoides
 †Picoides villosus
 †Pipilio
 †Pipilio erythrophthalamus
 Pipistrellus
 †Pipistrellus subflavus – or unidentified comparable form
  Pitar
 †Pitar macbeani
 †Pitar nuttalliopsis
 †Pitar trigoniata
 Pituophis
 †Pituophis melanoleucas
 Placopecten
  †Placopecten magellanicus
 †Plagiosmittia
 †Plagiosmittia porelloides
 Planorbis
 †Planorbis antiquatus
  †Platygonus
 †Platygonus compressus – or unidentified comparable form
 Plethodon
 †Plethodon glutinosus – or unidentified comparable form
 Pleuromeris
 †Pleuromeris tridentata
 Plicatula
 Podilymbus
 †Podilymbus podiceps
 Pogonias
  †Pogonias cromis
 †Pontosphaera
 †Potamides
 †Potamides cancelloides
 †Potamides saltillensis
 Prionocidaris – tentative report
 Prionotus
  Pristis
 †Pristis lathami
 †Pristis pickeringi – type locality for species
 Procyon
  †Procyon lotor
 †Propristis
 †Propristis schweinfurthi
 Pseudacris
 †Pseudacris ornata
 Pseudemys
 †Pseudemys concinna – or unidentified comparable form
  †Pseudhipparion
 †Pseudhipparion simpsoni – or unidentified comparable form
 Pseudomiltha
 †Pseudomiltha ocalanus
 Pseudotriton
  †Pseudotriton ruber
 †Psilocochlis
 †Psilocochlis mccalliei
 Pteria – report made of unidentified related form or using admittedly obsolete nomenclature
 †Pteria argentea – or unidentified comparable form
 †Pteropsella
 †Pteropsella lapidosa
 †Pterosphenus
 †Pterosphenus schucherti
 Pterynotus
 †Pterynotus rufirupicolus
 Puma
 †Puma concolor
 †Pyrazisinus
 †Pyrazisinus campanulatus
 †Pyrazisinus cornutus

Q

 Quercus

R

 Raja
 †Rana
  †Rana catesbiana – lapsus calami of Rana catesbeiana
 †Rana pipiens
 Rangia
 †Rangia cuneata
 Rangifer
  †Rangifer tarandus
 Rapana
 †Rapana vaughani
 †Regina
 Reticulofenestra
 †Reticulofenestra samodurovii
 †Reticulofenestra umbilica
 †Rhabdosphaera
  Rhinobatos
 †Rhinobatos casieri – or unidentified comparable form
 Rhinoptera
 Rhizoprionodon
  †Rhizoprionodon terraenovae
 †Rhopostoma
 †Rhopostoma cruciferum
 Rhyncholampas
 †Rhyncholampas ericsoni
 †Rhyncholampas gouldii
 †Rimosocella
 †Rimosocella laciniosa
 †Ringicardium
 †Ringicardium harrisi

S

 Sayornis
  †Sayornis phoebe
 Scalopus
 †Scalopus aquaticus
 Sceloporus
  †Sceloporus undulatus
 Schizaster
 †Schizaster americanus
 †Schizaster armiger
 Schizomavella
 †Schizomavella porosa
 Schizoporella
 †Schizoporella mcbeanensis – type locality for species
 †Schizorthosecos
 †Schizorthosecos interstitia
 †Scianops
 †Scianops ocellata
 Sciuropterus
 †Sciuropterus volans
 Sciurus
  †Sciurus carolinensis
 †Scoliodon
 †Scoliodon terraenovae
 Scolopax
 †Scolopax minor
  Scyliorhinus
 †Scyliorhinus distans
 †Scyliorhinus enniskilleni
 †Scyliorhinus gilberti
 Semele – tentative report
 Semihaswellia
 †Semihaswellia rectifurcata
 Siderastrea
 †Siderastrea silecensis
 Sigmodon
 †Sigmodon hispidus
 Sinum
 †Sinum imperforatum
 Siren
  †Siren intermedia – or unidentified comparable form
 Smittina
 †Smittina denticulifera
 †Smittina portentosa
 Solemya
 †Solemya alabamensis
 Solena
 †Solena lisbonensis
 Sorex
 †Sorex cinereus
 †Sorex fumeus
 Sphenolithus
 †Sphenolithus moriformis
 †Sphenolithus spiniger
  Sphyraena
 Sphyrna
  †Sphyrna tiburo
 †Sphyrna zygaena
 Spilogale
 †Spilogale putorius
 Spisula
 †Spisula praetenuis – or unidentified comparable form
 Spizella
 †Spizella passerina
 Spondylus
 †Spondylus filiaris
 Squatina
 †Squatina prima
  Sternotherus
 †Striatolamia
 †Striatolamia macrota
 Strigilla
 †Strigilla georgiana – type locality for species
 †Striostrea
 †Striostrea gigantissima
 Strioterebrum
 †Strioterebrum dislocatum
 Strombus
 †Stylocoenia
 †Stylocoenia pumpellyi
 Stylophora
 †Stylophora minutissima
 †Stylophora silicensis – type locality for species
 Sylvilagus
 †Sylvilagus floridanus
  †Sylvilagus palustris
 †Sylvilagus transitionalis
 Synaptomys
 †Synaptomys australis
 †Synaptomys cooperi
  Synodus

T

 Tamias – type locality for genus
 †Tamias aristus – type locality for species
  Tapirus
 †Tapirus haysii
 †Tapirus veroensis
 Taxodium
 Teinostoma
 †Teinostoma sublimata
  †Teleoceras
 Tellina
 †Tellina segregata
 Terebratulina
 †Terebratulina brundidgensis
 Teredo
 Terrapene
  †Terrapene carolina
 Thamnophis
 †Thamnophis sirtalis
 Trachemys
 †Trachemys scripta
 Trachycardium
 †Trachycardium eversum
 Trachyphyllia – tentative report
 †Transversopontis
  Tremarctos
 †Tremarctos floridanus
 †Triaenodon
 †Trichiuris
  Trichiurus
 Trochita
 †Trochita aperta
 Trochocyathus – tentative report
 †Truncorotaloides
 †Truncorotaloides rohri
 †Truncorotaloides topiensis – or unidentified comparable form
 Turris
 Turritella
 †Turritella alcida
 †Turritella aldrichi
 †Turritella dalli
 †Turritella halensis
 †Turritella humerosa
 †Turritella martinensis
 †Turritella nasuta
 †Turritella tampae
 †Turritella tennesseensis
 Tympanuchus
  †Tympanuchus cupido

U

  Ulmus
 Urocyon
 †Urocyon cinereoargenteus
 Ursus
  †Ursus americanus

V

 Venericardia
 †Venericardia bashiplata
 †Venericardia hatcheplata
 †Venericardia horatiana
 †Venericardia mediaplata
 †Venericardia ocalaedes
 †Venericardia praecisa
 †Venericardia smithii
 †Volutilithes – or unidentified comparable form
 †Volutilithes florencis

X

 Xancus
 †Xancus wilsoni
 Xenophora
  †Xenophora conchyliophora

Y

 Yoldia
 †Yoldia semenoides

Z

 Zapus
  †Zapus hudsonius
 †Zygolithus
 †Zygolithus dubius
 †Zygrhablithus
 †Zygrhablithus bijugatus

References
 

Cenozoic
Georgia